Phonogenic Records is a record label currently under the RCA Label Group, a division of Sony Music Entertainment. The label was originally conceived under BMG UK & Ireland. Acts currently signed to the label include: Natasha Bedingfield, Ross Copperman and The Script. Josh Krajcik, who came in second place on "The X Factor" U.S. in 2011, has signed a deal with Phonogenic Records. Sources say that Krajcik had offers from Sony Music labels Columbia Records and RCA Records, but Krajcik chose to sign with the smaller, boutique Phonogenic Records.

See also
 List of record labels

External links
 Official site

British record labels
Pop record labels
Sony Music